Aishwarya Devan is an Indian actress and Beauty queen from Kerala state who has acted in Malayalam, Tamil and Kannada language films. She was crowned Femina Miss India Maharashtra 2017 and represented Maharashtra state in Femina Miss India 2017. She won various subtitles during the contest and made it to top-6 finalists. 
She made her Hindi film debut with the film Kaashi in Search of Ganga.

Early life 
Aishwarya was born to Malayalee parents in Bangalore to  S. Devan, and Sheeja Devan who is from Shornur, Palakkad district, Kerala.

Career
She was debuted in a Tamil movie 'Yuvan' with  Siddharth Rajkumar and Rakul Preet Singh. Then in Malayalam, Deepan introduced her to Shaji Kailas who cast her in his film Simhasanam opposite Prudhviraj Sukumaran. She played a Bangalore-based girl who, after her Plus Two, enters college in both her films. Yuvan was her first Tamil film and Simhasanam was her first Malayalam film.

After Simhasanam, she acted in Bala's The Hitlist and Major Ravi’s Karmayodha.

In 2013, she received the lead role In V. K. Prakash's Thank You. In the early 2014 she signed up for the Tamil film Anegan directed by K.V. Anand as the second lead opposite Dhanush which released in the early 2015 and was a blockbuster, which also released as Anekudu in Telugu.

Filmography

References

External links
 

1993 births
Living people
21st-century Indian actresses
Indian film actresses
Actresses from Bangalore
Actresses in Tamil cinema
Actresses in Kannada cinema
Actresses in Malayalam cinema
Actresses in Telugu cinema
Actresses in Hindi cinema